"Atomic" is a 1980 song by American rock band Blondie from their fourth studio album, Eat to the Beat (1979). Written by Debbie Harry and Jimmy Destri and produced by Mike Chapman, the song was released as the album's third single.

Song information
"Atomic" was composed by Jimmy Destri and Debbie Harry, who (in the book "1000 UK #1 Hits" by Jon Kutner and Spencer Leigh) stated, "He was trying to do something like 'Heart of Glass', and then somehow or another we gave it the Spaghetti Western treatment. Before that it was just lying there like a lox. The lyrics, well, a lot of the time I would write while the band were just playing the song and trying to figure it out. I would just be scatting along with them and I would just start going, 'Ooooooh, your hair is beautiful.'" The word atomic in the song carries no fixed meaning and functions as a signifier of power and futurism. The bridge to, and the break in the melody before "Atomic" is spoken, is heavily influenced by the bridge in the song "I'm on my way" by Dean Parish.

The song was produced as a mixture of new wave, rock and disco which had proven to be so successful in their number-one single from earlier in 1979, "Heart of Glass". It is written in E natural minor. Billboard described "Atomic" as an "electronic enhanced dance number" in which the vocals blend with the instrumental music. Cash Box said that it continues "the rock-dance fission, or rather fusion, with '60s inspired surf guitars and ground zero drumming."

The 1980 single version of "Atomic" was a remix. The original 4:35 version as featured on the albums Eat to the Beat and 1981's The Best of Blondie opens with an intro inspired by the nursery rhyme "Three Blind Mice" and includes an instrumental break with a bass guitar solo. The 7″ version mixed by Mike Chapman omits the "Three Blind Mice" intro and replaces the instrumental break with a repeat of the verse.

Release and reception
The song was released in February 1980 and became the band's third number one in the UK Singles Chart, where it held the top spot for two weeks.  Record World called it an "electronic dancer." It reached the Top 40 in the US in Spring 1980. 

The B-side was "Die Young, Stay Pretty", also from the album Eat to the Beat, a reggae-influenced track, a style the band would perform again in their global chart-topper "The Tide Is High". The UK 12" single contained a live cover version of Bowie's "Heroes" featuring Robert Fripp on guitar recorded at London's Hammersmith Odeon just a month before. The track was included on 1993's rarities compilation, Blonde and Beyond.

"Atomic" was remixed and re-released in the UK in September 1994 where it peaked at #19 on the UK Top 40 singles chart. The subsequent April 1995 US release reached number one on the Billboard Dance/Club Play Charts. The 1994 remix was included on the compilations The Platinum Collection, Beautiful - The Remix Album and Remixed Remade Remodeled - The Remix Project. The track was remixed again four years later for the UK compilation Atomic - The Very Best of Blondie and the '98 Xenomania mix was later included on the first Queer as Folk soundtrack album.

In 2014, Blondie re-recorded the song for their  compilation album Greatest Hits Deluxe Redux. The compilation was part of a 2-disc set called Blondie 4(0) Ever which included their tenth studio album, Ghosts of Download, and marked the 40th anniversary of the forming of the band.

"Atomic" is widely considered one of Blondie's best songs. In 2017, Billboard ranked the song number six on their list of the 10 greatest Blondie songs, and in 2021, The Guardian ranked the song number two on their list of the 20 greatest Blondie songs.

Music video
The accompanying music video for "Atomic" depicts the band performing on stage at what looks like a post-apocalyptic nightclub in which Debbie Harry is wearing a garbage bag as a punkish futuristic costume. The audience at the club are also dressed in suitably futuristic costumes, and footage of a horseman with the "Blondie: in the disco" new year's concert advertisement. and an atomic explosion are also intercut. The video features late supermodel Gia Carangi dancing.

Track listing
 UK 7" (Chrysalis CHS 2410)
 US 7" (Chrysalis CHS 2410)
 "Atomic" (7" Mix) (Deborah Harry, Jimmy Destri) – 3:48
 "Die Young Stay Pretty" (Deborah Harry, Chris Stein) – 3:27

 UK 12" (Chrysalis CHS 12 2410)
 "Atomic" (7" Mix) (Deborah Harry, Jimmy Destri) – 3:48
 "Die Young Stay Pretty" (Deborah Harry, Chris Stein) – 3:27
 "Heroes" (Live) (David Bowie, Brian Eno) – 6:28
(Recorded live at The Hammersmith Odeon, London, on January 12, 1980. Produced by C. Stein, J. Destri and P. Maloney.)

 UK 1994 Remix CD1 (7243 8 81661 2 6)
"Atomic" (Diddy's Edit) – 4:10
"Atomic" (Diddy's 12" Mix) – 6:54
"Atomic" (Diddy's Push The Button Mix) – 6:06
"Atomic" (Boom Mix) – 5:49
"Atomic" (New Disco Mix) – 7:56

 UK 1994 Remix CD2 (7243 8 81662 2 5)
"Atomic" (Diddy's Edit) – 4:10
"Sunday Girl" – 3:01
"Union City Blue" – 3:18
"Atomic" (Original 1980 7" Edit) – 3:50

 US 1995 Remix CD (7243 8 58340 2 8)
"Atomic" (Diddy's Remix Edit) – 4:10 *
"Atomic" (Original Single Version) – 3:50 **
"Atomic" (Diddy's 12" Mix) – 6:54
"Atomic" (Armand's Atomizer Mix) – 9:00
"Atomic" (Explosive Ecstasy Mix) – 5:50
"Atomic" (Beautiful Drum and Bass Mix) – 7:43
"Atomic" (New Disco Mix) – 7:56
"Slow Motion" (Stripped Down Motown Mix) – 3:30

(* Identical to the UK Diddy's Edit version.)
(** Identical to the UK Original 1980 7" Edit version.)

Charts

Weekly charts

Year-end charts

Certifications

Sleepy Sleepers version
"Painimaan" by the Finnish band Sleepy Sleepers is a cover version of the song. The song was released on the band's 1980 album Metsäratio and is sung entirely in Finnish.

Party Animals version

"Atomic" was covered by Dutch group Party Animals and released as the fifth single from their second album, Party@worldaccess.nl (1997). The song was released in 1997 and was a minor success in Hong Kong. The song is a cover version of the Blondie song recorded with a gabber beat. The song peaked at number 8 in the Dutch Top 40.

Track listing
 "Atomic" (Flamman & Abraxas radio mix) – 3:31
 "Mocht Ik onder het Hakkûh Bezwijken" – 5:32
 "Atom-X" – 4:52
 "Total Smash" – 5:15

Charts

Weekly charts

Year-end charts

In other media
The song was used at the end of the first episode of the second series of Not the Nine O'Clock News in a sketch entitled 'Blatant Pornography'. The Blondie version of the song appeared in the 2002 video game Grand Theft Auto: Vice City on the fictional in-game radio station "Wave 103". The song was also covered by the British rock band Sleeper which was featured in the Trainspotting soundtrack, the spanish film Perdedores Natos soundtracks and HBO Max Series "The Flight Attendant" ending credits on Season 1, episode 7.

See also
List of number-one singles from the 1980s (UK)
List of number-one dance singles of 1995 (U.S.)

References

External links
 [ Allmusic.com Eat to the Beat article]
 Blondie discography
 Garry Mulholland, This is Uncool: The 500 Greatest Singles since Punk and Disco Cassell Illustrated 2004 page 116 

1979 songs
1980 singles
1997 singles
Blondie (band) songs
Party Animals (music group) songs
UK Singles Chart number-one singles
Songs written by Debbie Harry
Songs written by Jimmy Destri
Song recordings produced by Mike Chapman
Chrysalis Records singles